Palaemon ivonicus is a species of shrimp of the family Palaemonidae. There is some speculation that this species may be the same as Palaemon carteri.

References

Crustaceans described in 1950
Palaemonidae